Cosmosoma demantria is a moth of the family Erebidae. It was described by Herbert Druce in 1895. It is found on Dominica.

References

demantria
Moths described in 1895